"If You Were The Only Girl In The World" is the seventh episode of the fourth series of the period drama Upstairs, Downstairs. It first aired on 26 October 1974 on ITV.

Background
If You Were The Only Girl In The World was filmed in the studio on 3 and 18 June 1974, with the location footage being filmed on 12 and 13 June 1974. The rowing scenes were filmed at Frensham Ponds in Surrey and the French château scenes were filmed at Waddesdon Manor in Buckinghamshire. The episode was set in the summer of 1916.

Cast
Gordon Jackson - Hudson 
Jean Marsh - Rose 
Meg Wynn Owen - Hazel Bellamy
Joan Benham - Lady Prudence Fairfax
Joyce Heron - Lady Berkhamstead
Lesley-Anne Down - Georgina Worsley
Simon Williams - James Bellamy 
Jacqueline Tong - Daisy
Mel Churcher - Angela Barclay
Celia Imrie - Jenny
Patricia MacRae - Sister Menzies
Neville Hughes - Lt. Cmdr. Rupert Machin
Richard Ownes - Lt. Bowman
Venetia Maxwell - Mrs Vowles
Sarah Twist - Lucy
Brian Nolan - Man
Kenneth MacDonald - Soldier
William Ashley - Patron
Andrew Ray - Lt. Jack Dyson RFC

Plot
The tea party that was arranged by Hazel and Lady Prudence in Home Fires takes place in the Morning Room of 165, Eaton Place, and only three officers are there, along with Lady Berkhamstead and Mrs Vowles. Hazel befriends a shy, young airman called Jack Dyson, who like her has risen from the middle class. Lt. Jack Dyson MC and Hazel Bellamy soon start going out with each other. They go boating, see a show and go dancing, where they kiss passionately. The day before he goes back to the Front, Dyson goes to Eaton Place to say goodbye, but Hazel is out at the canteen. He then writes her a note, calling her his "only girl in the World".

Meanwhile, Georgina is now a nurse in France, along with her friend Angela Barclay and Jenny. James is now a Major, and when he arrives at Georgina's hospital, they spend the day together. When they separate at the end of the day, they kiss.

References

General
Richard Marson, "Inside UpDown - The Story of Upstairs, Downstairs", Kaleidoscope Publishing, 2005
Updown.org.uk - Upstairs, Downstairs Fansite

Upstairs, Downstairs (series 4) episodes
1974 British television episodes
Fiction set in 1916